Liam Jonathan Jordan (born 30 July 1998) is a South African professional footballer who plays for Swedish Allsvenskan side IF Brommapojkarna and the South Africa national team.

Club career
Jordan made his professional debut on 17 March 2015 against University of Pretoria in the 2015–16 Nedbank Cup.

In January 2018, he joined HB Køge on loan from Sporting B. The move was made permanent in the summer of 2018. On transfer deadline day, 1 February 2021, Jordan moved to fellow league club FC Helsingør on a deal for the rest of the season.

On 7 March 2023, Jordan joined newly promoted Swedish Allsvenskan side IF Brommapojkarna.

International career
After representing his country at under-17 and under-20 level, Jordan made his senior international debut for South Africa on 2 July 2017 against Tanzania in the 2017 COSAFA Cup.

Personal life 
He is the son of Keryn Jordan, a former South African footballer. Jordan was born during his father's time at Durban-based Manning Rangers and emigrated to New Zealand in 2004.

References

External links

Living people
1998 births
South African soccer players
South African expatriate soccer players
White South African people
Sportspeople from Durban
Association football forwards
South African people of British descent
South Africa international soccer players
South Africa youth international soccer players
South Africa under-20 international soccer players
Auckland City FC players
Bidvest Wits F.C. players
Sporting CP B players
HB Køge players
FC Helsingør players
IF Brommapojkarna players
Danish 1st Division players
South African expatriate sportspeople in Portugal
South African expatriate sportspeople in Denmark
South African expatriate sportspeople in Sweden
Expatriate footballers in Portugal
Expatriate men's footballers in Denmark
Expatriate footballers in Sweden